AAAL may refer to:
American Association for Applied Linguistics
Arthritis-attributable activity limitation, in the epidemiology of arthritis